In the Christian sacrament of the Eucharist, the mixed chalice is the admixture of emblessed water and emblessed wine.  In preparing the sacrament, the priest blesses the water to represent the grace of God bestowed during baptism with water.  The holy water is then mixed with red wine, which symbolises the blood of Christ, so as to represent the uniting of man-seeking-God (Baptism) and God-reaching-out-to-man (the Passion).  In the same way, the Mass is a communion with the whole Christ: Jesus's Incarnation, ministry, Passion and Resurrection.  The mixed chalice also represents the hypostatic union, God incarnate, that subsists in the Trinitarian view of Christ.

External links

 Mixed Chalice in the Episcopal Church glossary

Eucharist